Mount Sphinx is a mountain rising to 2,200 m, the culminating peak of the Prince de Ligne Mountains, standing 9 nautical miles (17 km) north of the Belgica Mountains. Discovered by Belgian Antarctic Expedition, 1957-58, under G. de Gerlache, who named it for its characteristic form resembling a sphinx.

Mountains of Queen Maud Land
Prince Harald Coast